Lac du Brévent is a lake in the municipality of Chamonix, Haute-Savoie, France. It is located below the  Le Brévent peak, at an elevation of approx. 2125 m.

External links
  

Brevent